Allerston is a village and civil parish in the Ryedale district of  North Yorkshire, England, about  east of Pickering. According to the 2001 census, the parish had a population of 309, reducing slightly to 302  at the 2011 Census.

The parish church, originally dedicated to St Mary, is now dedicated to St John and is a grade II* listed building.

Overview

During the 1930s, unemployed men were set to work in Dalby Forest, breaking ground, building tracks, and undertaking other heavy labour. The men lived in a work camp in Low Dalby, which was one of a number of so-called Instructional Centres run by the Ministry of Labour in order to 'harden' young men who had been out of work for some time. By 1938, the Ministry was operating 35 Instructional Centres across Britain, with a total capacity of over 6,000 places. By 1939, though, unemployment was declining in the face of impending war, and the Ministry closed down its work camps.

The Cayley Arms, the village pub and Bed and Breakfast, is named after George Cayley the British Aviation Pioneer, who held lands in the surrounding area.

At the bottom of the village is Ebberston railway station of the now-closed Forge Valley Line. The station is now known as The Old Station and is run as a self-catering holiday accommodation business.

Captain Oates of Antarctic fame once owned a farm in the village.

References

External links 

 Allerston
 St John's Church
 

Villages in North Yorkshire
Civil parishes in North Yorkshire